McDowell's may refer to:

McDowell's, alcohol brand produced by United Spirits
McDowell's, fictional restaurant in movie Coming to America.

See also

McDowell (disambiguation)